Quaker lady may refer to:
 Quaker lady hosta (Hosta 'Quaker Lady')
 Quaker lady tall bearded iris (Iris 'Quaker Lady')